Sophia is a town in Raleigh County, West Virginia, United States. It was incorporated in 1912. The population was 1,124 at the 2020 census.

History
A post office called Sophia has been in operation since 1909. The town was named for Sophia McGinnis, the family member of a local civil servant. The town incorporated in 1912.

Geography

Demographics

2010 census
At the 2010 census there were 1,344 people, 590 households, and 391 families living in the town. The racial makeup of the town was 97.2% White, 0.7% African American, 0.2% Native American, 0.7% Asian, 0.1% from other races, and 1.0% from two or more races. Hispanic or Latino of any race were 0.1%.

Of the 590 households 30.7% had children under the age of 18 living with them, 46.4% were married couples living together, 14.2% had a female householder with no husband present, 5.6% had a male householder with no wife present, and 33.7% were non-families. 29.8% of households were one person and 14.2% were one person aged 65 or older. The average household size was 2.28 and the average family size was 2.77.

The median age in the town was 40.1 years. 22.2% of residents were under the age of 18; 7.1% were between the ages of 18 and 24; 27% were from 25 to 44; 26.7% were from 45 to 64; and 17% were 65 or older. The gender makeup of the town was 46.0% male and 54.0% female.

2000 census
At the 2000 census there were 1,301 people, 588 households, and 386 families living in the town. The population density was 1,902.5 inhabitants per square mile (738.7/km). There were 643 housing units at an average density of 940.3 per square mile (365.1/km).  The racial makeup of the town was 96.62% White, 1.15% African American, 0.31% Native American, 0.54% Asian, 0.15% from other races, and 1.23% from two or more races. Hispanic or Latino of any race were 0.61%.

Of the 588 households 26.2% had children under the age of 18 living with them, 45.1% were married couples living together, 17.2% had a female householder with no husband present, and 34.2% were non-families. 31.3% of households were one person and 15.1% were one person aged 65 or older. The average household size was 2.21 and the average family size was 2.75.

The age distribution was 21.5% under the age of 18, 7.8% from 18 to 24, 27.8% from 25 to 44, 26.6% from 45 to 64, and 16.2% 65 or older. The median age was 41 years. For every 100 females, there were 82.7 males. For every 100 females age 18 and over, there were 76.3 males.

The median household income was $26,008 and the median family income  was $31,200. Males had a median income of $30,875 versus $17,273 for females. The per capita income for the town was $15,296. About 22.1% of families and 23.6% of the population were below the poverty line, including 41.9% of those under age 18 and 15.1% of those age 65 or over.

Notable person
 Robert Byrd, United States Senator

References

Towns in Raleigh County, West Virginia
Towns in West Virginia
Robert Byrd
Populated places established in 1912
1912 establishments in West Virginia